The Green Phantom is a Canadian wrestler and teacher from Montreal, Quebec. He has wrestled for International Wrestling Syndicate (IWS) since 2001 and has been the IWS Canadian Championship since November 2021. He is originally from Deux-Montagnes, a suburb of Montreal.

References

Year of birth missing (living people)
Living people
Professional wrestlers from Montreal